Cae Blaen-dyffryn is a Site of Special Scientific Interest (SSSI) in Carmarthen & Dinefwr,  Wales.

Its southern boundary abuts the A482 road.

See also
List of Sites of Special Scientific Interest in Carmarthen & Dinefwr

References

External links
Cae Blaen-dyffryn SSSI marked on DEFRA's MAGIC Map

Sites of Special Scientific Interest in Carmarthen & Dinefwr